Cypraeorbis is an extinct genus of sea snails, marine gastropod mollusks in the subfamily Cypraeinae of the family Cypraeidae.

Species
Species within the genus Cypraeorbis include:
 † Cypraeorbis gaasensis Dolin & Lozouet, 2004 
 † Cypraeorbis sphaeroides (Conrad, 1848) 
 † Cypraeorbis vesicularis Dolin & Lozouet, 2004 
Species brought into synonymy
 † Cypraeorbis emilyae Dolin, 1991 : synonymù of † Loxacypraea emilyae (Dolin, 1991) † (original combination)

References

 Dolin, L. & Lozouet, P., 2004. Nouvelles espèces de Gastéropodes (Mollusca: Gastropoda) de l'Oligocène et du Miocène inférieur de l'Aquitaine (Sud-Ouest de la France). Partie 3. Cypraeidae et Ovulidae. Cossmanniana: 164 pp, sér. hors série n°4

External links
 Conrad T.A. (1865). Catalogue of the Eocene and Oligocene Testacea of the United States. American Journal of Conchology. 1(1): 1-35

Cypraeidae